There are at least 25 named lakes and reservoirs in Sebastian County, Arkansas.

Lakes
Courthouse Slough, el.  
Greenwood Lake, el.  
Lake Spur, el.  
Sugar Loaf Lake, el.

Reservoirs
Bailey Hill Reservoir, el.  
Booneville Lake, el.  
Crain Lake, el.  
Crouch Lake, el.  
Crowe Hill Reservoir, el.  
Echols Lake, el.  
Engineer Lake, el.  
Gurisco Lake, el.  
Lake Number One, el.  
Lake Number Two, el.  
Mansfield Lake, el.  
McMahan Lake, el.  
Number Name Lake, el.  
Park Lake, el.  
Pool 13, el.  
Sebastian Lake, el.  
Shadow Lake, el.  
Wildcat Mountain Lake, el.  
Williamson Lake, el.  
Willies Lake, el.  
Wofford Lake, el.

See also
 List of lakes in Arkansas

Notes

Bodies of water of Sebastian County, Arkansas
Sebastian